The women's 4 x 400 metres relay at the 2017 World Championships in Athletics was held at the London Olympic Stadium on .

Summary

In the final, the early leader was Nigeria as Patience Okon George made up the stagger on Botswana to her outside as they entered the far turn. Chrisann Gordon pulled Jamaica close to Nigeria on the inside but lost some ground coming off the turn. Down the home stretch, George faded while Quanera Hayes brought USA into the lead at the handoff to Allyson Felix. Felix ran a fast turn to put some separation on the field by the break. Further outside, Jamaica's Anneisha McLaughlin-Whilby was the next in contention until about 50 metres into her leg she McLaughlin-Whilby began to hop and lean back in pain. The entire field passed her as she tried to continue to the break line before collapsing to the track. Felix and USA had a 20-metre lead over the next best, Nigeria, a metre ahead of Great Britain.

Felix continued to expand the lead. Down the homestretch, Laviai Nielsen ran GBR past Nigeria's Abike Funmilola Egbeniyi, but USA had already passed to Shakima Wimbley almost four seconds before the other teams arrived. Iga Baumgart ran around the outside and after the handoff Aleksandra Gaworska, Poland was behind GBR's Eilidh Doyle breaking away from the other teams. 25 metres behind USA, Doyle opened up almost five metres on Gaworska but on the home stretch Doyle began to fade, Gaworska came back while Wimbley was speeding away. USA passed to world champion Phyllis Francis for their anchor. Over five seconds later, GBR passed to Emily Diamond slightly ahead of Poland's pass to Justyna Święty. Francis continued to expand the lead. Behind her Diamond opened up as much as a 10-metre gap on Święty while Nigeria's Yinka Ajayi and France's Elea-Mariama Diarra almost catching her from behind by the half way mark. Francis finished six seconds ahead of Diamond, a virtual walkover gold for USA, with Święty closing rapidly on the homestretch to get Poland close to GBR by the finish.

The 5.98 second margin of victory was the largest in World Championship  history.

Records
Before the competition records were as follows:

The following records were set at the competition:

Qualification criteria
The first eight placed teams at the 2017 IAAF World Relays and the host country qualify automatically for entry with remaining places being filled by teams with the fastest performances during the qualification period.

Schedule
The event schedule, in local time (UTC+1), is as follows:

Results

Heats

The first round took place on 12 August in two heats as follows:

The first three in each heat ( Q ) and the next two fastest ( q ) qualified for the final. The overall results were as follows:

Final
The final took place on 13 August at 20:55. The results were as follows (photo finish):

References

relay
Relays at the World Athletics Championships
Women's sport in London